Mihai Marinescu (born 25 January 1989 in Brașov, Romania) is a professional Romanian racing driver formerly competing in the Formula Renault 3.5 Series.

He currently works as a race engineer for Jenzer Motorsport.

Career

Formula Junior & Formula Renault 1.6
After securing several Romanian national karting titles, Marinescu began his racing career in 2005, driving in the Italian Formula Junior 1600 and Belgian Formula Renault 1.6 series. He took six podium places to finish runner-up in the Italian championship, behind Pasquale Di Sabatino, and took three race wins to finish third in the Belgian standings.

Formula Renault
In 2005, Marinescu also took part in selected Eurocup Formula Renault 2.0 races and the end-of-season Italian Formula Renault 2.0 winter series, in which he finished thirteenth.

In 2006, he drove a full season in the Italian Formula Renault 2.0 championship, finishing eleventh, and in the Formula Renault 2.0 Northern European Cup, where he finished sixth overall. He also drove in three French Formula Renault 2.0 races, failing to score a point.

In 2007, Marinescu dovetailed two championships once again, racing full seasons in both Eurocup Formula Renault 2.0 and Italian Formula Renault 2.0. In the former, he secured a single podium finish at the Hungaroring to be classified in eleventh place, whilst in the latter he took three podium places to finish fifth in the championship.

British Formula 3
At the end of the 2007 season, Marinescu also contested two British Formula 3 Championship races for Räikkönen Robertson Racing at Rockingham Motor Speedway, taking a National Class podium during the weekend.

Formula BMW
For 2008, Marinescu joined Fisichella Motor Sport to race in the newly formed Formula BMW Europe championship, which supported the Formula One World Championship at each European race meeting. He finished eleventh in the championship. In November 2008, he took victory in the Formula BMW Pacific race that supported the annual Formula Three Macau Grand Prix. He also took part in selected races in the Formula BMW Americas championship. At Montreal in June 2008 he was lucky to escape unhurt from a massive first lap crash involving Mikaël Grenier and Daniel Juncadella.

International Formula Master
In October 2008, Marinescu competed in the final round of the International Formula Master season at Monza. Driving for Pro Motorsport, he finished third in the first race before retiring from the second event.

Formula Renault 3.5 Series
In March 2009, Marinescu took part in Formula Renault 3.5 Series pre-season testing for the Austrian Interwetten.com team before signing with them a few days before the first round of the season in Barcelona. However, he was replaced by Tobias Hegewald after the first championship event, but this was only for Hegewald to gain experience of the circuit for his forthcoming F2 campaign, with Marinescu returning to the team for the following round in Monaco.

However, before the next round in Hungary, Marinescu left Interwetten.com and signed for the Italian RC Motorsport team to partner Pasquale Di Sabatino. He returned to Interwetten at Le Mans, but failed to break into the points.

Formula Two
In 2010, Marinescu joined the FIA Formula Two Championship. He consistently finished in the midfield, and signed up to race in the series again in 2011. On 1 October 2011, Marinescu won his maiden race in Formula 2 at Monza.

Hobbies
Marinescu is an avid bicycle rider and keeps fit during the winter break by cycling in the mountains around his home city Braşov. A video featuring the young race driver descending the famous Transfăgărășan highway in Romania on his Trek racing bike became an instant hit on YouTube.

Racing record

Career summary

† As Marinescu was a guest driver, he was ineligible to score points.

Complete Formula Renault 3.5 Series results
(key) (Races in bold indicate pole position) (Races in italics indicate fastest lap)

Complete FIA Formula Two Championship results
(key) (Races in bold indicate pole position) (Races in italics indicate fastest lap)

Complete GP2 Final results
(key) (Races in bold indicate pole position) (Races in italics indicate fastest lap)

References

External links

1989 births
Living people
Sportspeople from Brașov
Romanian racing drivers
Belgian Formula Renault 1.6 drivers
Italian Formula Renault 2.0 drivers
Formula Renault Eurocup drivers
French Formula Renault 2.0 drivers
Formula Renault 2.0 NEC drivers
Formula BMW Pacific drivers
Formula BMW Europe drivers
Formula BMW USA drivers
International Formula Master drivers
British Formula Three Championship drivers
FIA Formula Two Championship drivers
GP2 Series drivers
World Series Formula V8 3.5 drivers
Eurocup Mégane Trophy drivers
Prema Powerteam drivers
Rapax Team drivers
Zeta Corse drivers
RC Motorsport drivers
Motaworld Racing drivers
Double R Racing drivers
Italian Formula Renault 1.6 drivers
Scuderia Coloni drivers